Sillunu Oru Sandhippu is a 2013 Tamil language romance film written and directed by Ravi Lallin in his directorial debut venture. The film stars Vimal, Oviya and Dipa Shah in the lead roles. The film was earlier titled as Sillu Sillunu Oru Sandhippu, which was later changed to Sillunu Oru Sandhippu.

Plot

Ashok (Vimal) and Geetha (Oviya) fall in love when in school, but are separated by their families. Years later, Ashok returns to the country from the US and begins a relationship with Charumathi (Dipa Shah), but chaos ensues when Geetha comes back into his life.

Cast 

 Vimal as Ashok
 Oviya as Geetha
 Dipa Shah as Charumathi
 Charuhasan
 Manobala
 Ashvin Raja
 Brinda Parekh (Item number)
 Javno Isshiki (Item number)
 Jugnu Ishiqui (Item number)

Production 
Earlier titled as Unmai Sonnaal Nesipaya and then Anaithukkum Aasaipadu and then as Sillu Sillunu Oru Sandhippu, major portions of filming was done in Chennai, Ooty and Malaysia till February 2012. The second schedule began after the end of FEFSI strike. The last schedule was happening in the month of April.

Director Ravi Lallin said "I have worked with T. Nagaraj and Vincent Selva and written the dialogues for Newtonin Moondram Vidhi under the name Chidambaram. Sillunu Oru Santhippu is based on a real-life incident, which took place in a family court in Chennai in 2000".

Dipa Shah and Oviya initially had a misunderstanding during the shooting.

Soundtrack
The music of the film is composed by F. S. Faizal who earlier composed for S. J. Suryah starrer Newtonin Moondram Vidhi under the name Vinay. The single track launch event took place on 15 September at the Loyola College in Chennai among young Chennaiites. The track that goes 'Busse Busse...' is crooned by Vijay Prakash and reflects on Bus Day that's usually celebrated by college goers. Audio was launched on 15 October 2012. All the songs were written by Viveka.

 "Yaayum Yaayum" - Haricharan, Hemambika
 "Adi Aathi" - Aalap Raju, Anitha
 "Busse Busse" - Vijay Prakash, Rita
 "Bul Bultara" - Sam P. Keerthan, Ramya NSK
 "Minminiye" - Karthik, Manotaangy

Critical reception
Hindu wrote:"the film meanders [sic] sign enough that this is one meeting you should avoid". Behindwoods wrote:"The theme might be topical [sic] but the director dilutes the effect with too many messages and sermons throughout the film [sic] disjointed episodes that do not contribute to the flow of the film and its retro characterization". Times of India wrote:"director Ravi Lallin starts off with an interesting premise [sic] but it is in the execution that he falters". Rediff wrote:"Sillunu Oru Sandhippu is a must watch for all teenagers who believe that their love is real and will stand the test of time".

References

External links
 

2013 films
Indian romance films
2010s Tamil-language films
Films shot in Ooty
2013 directorial debut films
2013 romance films